The 14th Michigan Infantry Regiment was an infantry regiment that served in the Union Army during the American Civil War.

Service
The 14th Michigan Infantry was organized at Ypsilanti and Detroit, Michigan, and was mustered into Federal service for a three-year enlistment on February 13, 1862.

The regiment was converted to mounted infantry on September 8, 1863, being re-armed with the Spencer repeating rifle at that time.

The regiment was mustered out of service on July 18, 1865.

Total strength and casualties
The regiment suffered 1 officer and 58 enlisted men who were killed in action or mortally wounded and 3 officers and 184 enlisted men who died of disease, for a total of 246
fatalities.

Commanders
 Colonel Henry Rutgeras Mizner

See also
List of Michigan Civil War Units
Michigan in the American Civil War

References

External links
The Civil War Archive
 

Units and formations of the Union Army from Michigan
1862 establishments in Michigan
Military units and formations established in 1862
1865 disestablishments in Michigan
Military units and formations disestablished in 1865